Daus is a surname. Notable people with the surname include:

Joshard Daus (born 1947), German choral conductor
Matthew W. Daus, American lawyer and vehicular commissioner
Ronald Daus (born 1943), German university professor
Rudolphe Daus (1854–1916), American architect

See also
Dau (surname)